Shabnaz (born Sabrina Tania) is a retired Bangladeshi film actress. She won Bangladesh National Film Award for Best Actress for her role in the film Nirmom (1996). Shabnaz debuted her acting career in the film Chandni, directed by Ehtesham in 1991.

Personal life
Shabnaz married her co-artist, Nayeem, on 4 October 1994. They have two daughters. They reside in Tangail.

Filmography

References

External links

Living people
Bangladeshi film actresses
Best Actress National Film Awards (Bangladesh) winners
Place of birth missing (living people)
Year of birth missing (living people)